Marcel Schmelzer (born 22 January 1988) is a German former professional footballer who last played as a left-back for Bundesliga club Borussia Dortmund, serving as captain from 2016 to 2018. He was capped by Germany at international level. A one-club man, Schmelzer spent his entire professional career at Dortmund.

Club career
Schmelzer was born in Magdeburg, Saxony-Anhalt. He started his professional career with Borussia Dortmund, making his first appearance on 9 August 2008, in the German Cup first-round match against Rot-Weiss Essen. His first league appearance came in the following week, as he played the final twenty minutes of a 3–2 win at Bayer Leverkusen. Schmelzer had his best season for Borussia Dortmund in the 2010–11 season, where he managed to play every minute of the season for the team who went on to win the Bundesliga that year.

The following season, Schmelzer, who missed the beginning of the Bundesliga due to injury, enjoyed yet another trophy as he helped Dortmund win another Bundesliga title. In addition to being the left back for the team for the entire season, Schmelzer also helped Dortmund secure the DFB Pokal with a 5–2 win against Bayern Munich, making it three titles in two years.

On 11 January 2013, Schmelzer extended his contract with Borussia, which will keep him at the club until 2017.

On 27 July 2013, Schmelzer won the 2013 DFL-Supercup with Dortmund 4–2 against rivals Bayern Munich.

On 25 April 2016, Marcel Schmelzer yet again extended his contract with BVB. He agreed on a five-year deal which will keep him with the black and yellows through 2021.

After the departure of Mats Hummels, Schmelzer was named a candidate to be the new captain. On 14 August 2016, Schmelzer captained his first match against league champions Bayern Munich during the 2–0 defeat of the DFL-Supercup.

On 31 May 2020, he scored his first Bundesliga goal in seven years in a 6–1 win against Paderborn, coming off the bench for Moroccan right-back Achraf Hakimi. Later that day, fans voted him as Man of the Match on the club's official Instagram account. Despite missing virtually the entire 2020–21 season and Dortmund's DFB-Pokal triumph, Schmelzer extended his contract with Dortmund in summer 2021 for another year, although this was primarily to cover medical insurance regarding a long-term knee injury rather than concerning game time.

He retired after 17 seasons as a Borussia Dortmund player and was celebrated after their game against Hertha BSC. Overall he played 258 German top-flight matches.

International career

Schmelzer was called up by the U21 team for the 2009 European Championship, being used regularly, although not as a starter, he played the final five minutes in the final, a 4–0 success against England. For the full national team he made 16 appearances between 2010 and 2014.

Personal life
Schmelzer is married to Jenny Schmelzer.

Career statistics

Club

International

Honours

Borussia Dortmund
 Bundesliga: 2010–11, 2011–12
 DFB-Pokal: 2011–12, 2016–17, 2020–21
 DFL-Supercup: 2013, 2014, 2019
 UEFA Champions League runner-up: 2012–13

Germany U21
 UEFA European Under-21 Championship: 2009

See also
 List of one-club men

References

External links

 Borussia Dortmund profile 
 
 
 
 
 Bundesliga profile

1988 births
Living people
Sportspeople from Magdeburg
German footballers
Footballers from Saxony-Anhalt
Association football fullbacks
Germany under-21 international footballers
Germany international footballers
UEFA Euro 2012 players
Bundesliga players
3. Liga players
Regionalliga players
Borussia Dortmund players
Borussia Dortmund II players